Hušbišag or Hushbishag is a Sumerian netherworld goddess. She is the wife of Namtar and mother of Hemdikug, a daughter.

References

Mesopotamian goddesses
Underworld goddesses